Final Pia or Finale Pia is one of three urban forming the Ligurian town of Finale Ligure, near Savona, northern Italy. An independent municipality until 1927, it was later merged with Finale Marina and Finalborgo to form the modern town of Finale Ligure.
The village is situated along the Via Aurelia, however, most of the buildings face the banks of the river Sciusa, especially after the big residential development in the postwar period, expansion that has effectively united the center of the inner Finale Pia Calvisio frazione, at about one kilometer from the coast.

History 
The  old town developed around the church of Santa Maria Pia in medieval times. Like other centers of Finale, Finale Pia was part of Marquisate of Finale under the Del Carretto, the Kingdom of Spain and Republic of Genoa, until it was annexed to Piedmont-Sardinia in the 19th century.

Gallery

Frazioni of the Province of Savona
Former municipalities of the Province of Savona